James Matthew "Matt" Van Oekel (born September 20, 1986) is an American professional soccer player who plays as a goalkeeper for USL Championship club Birmingham Legion FC.

Career

Youth and college
Van Oekel played one year of college soccer at Longwood University before transferring to Rutgers in his sophomore year. With Rutgers, he played in 47 games and earned 20 wins.

Professional
Van Oekel signed with Minnesota out of college in 2008, after impressing staff at the Thunder combine in February 2008.

He made his professional debut on September 13, 2009, in 1–1 draw with Montreal Impact, and was released at the end of the season when the Thunder failed, before being picked up by their successor NSC Minnesota Stars, in April 2010.

Minnesota United FC, now playing in the North American Soccer League, re-signed Van Oekel for the 2011 season on March 11, 2011. Minnesota announced in December 2011 that Van Oekel would return for the 2012 season.

Van Oekel signed with Major League Soccer side Real Salt Lake on December 22, 2016. On March 25, 2017, Van Oekel made his first MLS start with RSL, tallying three saves against New York Red Bulls.

Van Oekel signed with USL side Oklahoma City Energy FC on January 5, 2018.

Van Oekel was acquired by Birmingham Legion FC on December 12, 2018.

References

1986 births
Living people
American people of Dutch descent
American soccer players
Association football goalkeepers
Birmingham Legion FC players
FC Edmonton players
Longwood University alumni
Major League Soccer players
Minnesota Thunder players
Minnesota United FC (2010–2016) players
North American Soccer League players
OKC Energy FC players
Real Monarchs players
Real Salt Lake players
Rutgers Scarlet Knights men's soccer players
Soccer players from Virginia
Sportspeople from Chesapeake, Virginia
USL Championship players
USL First Division players
USSF Division 2 Professional League players